The year 1954 saw the conception of Project Orbiter, the first practicable satellite launching project, utilizing the Redstone, a newly developed Short Range Ballistic Missile.

A variety of sounding rockets continued to return scientific data from beyond the  boundary of space (as defined by the World Air Sports Federation), including the Viking and Aerobee rockets, University of Iowa and Naval Research Laboratory ship-launched rockoons, and derivatives of the Soviet R-1 missile. The French also launched their first sounding rocket into space, the Véronique-NA.

1954 also marked a year of development of the Intercontinental Ballistic Missile (ICBM). The United States prioritized the development of its Atlas while the Soviet Union authorized the draft proposal for the R-7 Semyorka, its first ICBM.

Space exploration highlights

US Navy

After ten months of salvage, testing, and troubleshooting following the failed launch of Viking 10 on 30 June 1953, a successful static firing of the rebuilt rocket took place at the end of April 1954. Launch was scheduled for 4 May. Control issues revealed in the static firing as well as gusty, sand-laden winds caused a delay of three days. At 10:00 AM local time, Viking 10 blasted off from its pad at the White Sands Missile Range in New Mexico, reaching an altitude of —a tie with the highest altitude ever reached by a first-generation Viking (Viking 7 on 7 August 1951). Data was received from the rocket for all stages of the flight, and its scientific package returned the first measurement of positive ion composition at high altitudes.

Viking 11, which was ready for erection on 5 May, also had a successful static test and was ready for launch, 24 May 1954. Again, the countdown went without hold, and Viking 11, the heaviest rocket yet in the series, was launched at 10:00 AM. Forty seconds into the flight, several puffs of smoke issued from the vehicle, but these accidental excitations of the rocket's roll jets did no harm. Viking 11 ultimately reached  in altitude, a record for the series, snapping the highest altitude photographs of the Earth to date. Both Vikings 10 and 11 carried successful emulsions experiments, measuring cosmic rays at high altitudes.

Three more Viking flights were scheduled, one of which would fly in 1955, the other two later incorporated into the subsequent Project Vanguard.

American civilian efforts

For the third summer in a row, members of the State University of Iowa (SUI) physics department embarked 15 July 1954 on an Atlantic expedition to launch a series of balloon-launched Deacon rockets (rockoons), this time aboard the icebreaker, . Once again, a Naval Research Laboratory team accompanied them to launch their own rockoons. Beginning with the fourth SUI launch on 21 July 1954 off the northern tip of Labrador, eleven rockoon launches (seven of them successful) over a five-day period probed the heart of the auroral zone at high altitude. Each rockoon carried two geiger counters with different thicknesses of shielding; two of the flights determined that aurorae produced detectable "soft" (lower energy/penetrative) radiation.

Scientific results

By 1954, the array of Viking, Aerobee, V-2, Deacon Rockoon, and other high altitude sounding rocket flights had returned a bonanza of knowledge about the upper atmosphere. Previously, it had been believed that, at altitudes above , Earth's atmosphere was highly stratified and peaceful, an indefinite continuation of the stratosphere. Ionized particles were discovered in what were previously thought to be distinct gaps between the E and F layers in the ionosphere.

Sounding rockets returned the first measurements of extraterrestrial X-rays, blocked from observation from the ground by the lower layers of the atmosphere. It was determined that these X-rays were one of the major producers of atmospheric ionization. Ultraviolet radiation was extensively observed as well as its contribution to the ozone layer. Solar radiation data determined that the Sun was hotter than had been calculated from strictly earthbound measurements. Cosmic rays were found to consist mainly of protons, alpha particles, and heavier atomic nuclei; the range of measured elements extended to iron, with greater abundance in even mass numbered elements.

Vehicle development

US Air Force

On February 1, 1954, the Strategic Missiles Evaluation Committee or 'Teapot Committee', comprising eleven of the top scientists and engineers in the country, issued a report recommending prioritization of the development of the Atlas, the nation's first ICBM. Trevor Gardner, special assistant for research and development to Secretary of the Air Force, Harold Talbott, selected Ramo Wooldridge (R-W) to handle the systems engineering and technical direction for the entire project, a considerable expansion of duties for the year-old company, which had hitherto been contracted by the Air Force to advise and perform research. From spring 1954 through the end of the year, R-W's work was confined to the evaluation of the project and the accumulation of personnel to handle development of the ICBM. Convair, which had been developing the Atlas for the prior eight years, remained the manufacturer of the missile proper.

The public first became aware of the Atlas project with the publication of the 8 March 1954 issue of Aviation Weekly, in which appeared the short item: "Convair is developing a long range ballistic missile known as the Atlas. Its development was begun in the era when Floyd Odlum's Atlas Corp. was the controlling stockholder in Convair."

Project Orbiter

By 1954, there was growing consensus in the United States that rocket technology had evolved to the point the launch of an Earth orbiting satellite was becoming feasible. A 16 March meeting in Washington D.C. involving several of the nation's leading space specialists was arranged by past president of the American Rocket Society Frederick C. Durant III. They included Fred Singer, proposer of the "MOUSE" (Minimum Orbiting Unmanned Satellite of the Earth), rocket scientist Wernher von Braun, David Young of the Army Ballistic Missile Agency, Commander George Hoover and Alexander Satin of the Air Branch of the Office of Naval Research (ONR), and noted astronomer, Fred Whipple. They determined that a slightly modified Redstone (a ) range surface-to-surface missile developed the prior year) combined with upper stages employing 31 Loki solid-propellant rockets could put a  satellite into orbit, which could be tracked optically.

Whipple approached the National Science Foundation (NSF) to sponsor a conference for further study of the idea, particularly to develop instrumentation for a satellite. The NSF took no immediate action. Hoover, however, was able to secure interest from the ONR, and by November 1954, a satellite-launching plan had been developed. Dubbed Project Orbiter, the "no-cost satellite" would be built largely from existing hardware; the Army would design and construct the booster system (using Redstone and Loki) while the Navy would handle creation of the satellite, tracking facilities, and the acquisition and analysis of data. By the end of the year, ONR had let $60,000 in three contracts for feasibility studies and initial design.

Soviet Union

The R-5 missile, able to carry the same  payload as the R-1 and R-2 but over a distance of  underwent its third series of test launches, beginning 12 August 1954 and continuing through 7 February 1955. These tests confirmed the soundness of the design and cleared the way for nuclear and sounding rocket variants.

Paralleling developments in the United States, 1954 marked the authorization of the R-7 Semyorka ICBM (on 20 May). Mikhail Tikhonravov, whose team at had completed the ICBM studies that formed the conceptual framework for the R-7, on 27 May, at the urging of OKB-1 Chief Designer Sergei Korolev, submitted a memorandum entitled, "A Report on an Artificial Satellite of the Earth" to Deputy Minister of Medium Machine Building Vasiliy Rabikov and Georgiy Pashkov, Rabikov's department chief in charge of missiles. This memorandum, containing summaries of both Soviet research of recent years as well as translations of Western articles on satellites, served as the catalyst for the Soviet satellite program.

Launches

February

|}

March

|}

April

|}

May

|}

June

|}

July

|}

August

|}

September

|}

October

|}

November

|}

December

|}

Suborbital launch summary

By country

By rocket

See also
Timeline of spaceflight

References

Footnotes

1954 in spaceflight
Spaceflight by year